Maximilian Grabner (2 October 1905 – 24 January 1948) was an Austrian Gestapo chief in Auschwitz. At Auschwitz, the infamous torture chamber Block 11 was Grabner's own empire. He was executed for crimes against humanity.

Early life
Born in Vienna, Grabner joined the Austrian police force in 1930 and became a member of the then-illegal Nazi Party in 1933. After the Anschluß of Austria in 1938, he joined the SS and became a member of the Gestapo. He arrived at Katowice at the outbreak of World War II. He was transferred to Auschwitz concentration camp less than one year later where he became Chief of the Politische Abteilung ("camp Gestapo").

Career at Auschwitz
As Gestapo chief, Grabner was responsible, among other things, for the fight against the resistance movement in the camp, as well as for the prevention of escapes and all contact with the outside world. These tasks were carried out with horrendous cruelties against the prisoners and a large number of incarcerations in the bunker in Block 11. Grabner's staff members, such as Wilhelm Boger, who was only brought to justice in the early 1960s, carried out so-called sharpened interrogations, during which the victims were systematically tortured.

Grabner, together with the commander of the Schutzhaftlager, initiated, on a regular basis, clearings of the bunker: the inmates were examined and many of them were sent directly to the inner courtyard between Block 10 and Block 11, where they were shot. He once ordered SS-Untersturmführer Hans Stark to drop Zyklon B into a gas chamber. Along with Stark, Grabner personally took part in the shooting of Russian Commissars.

Trial and conviction
In 1943, Grabner was arrested for theft, graft and corruption and was put on trial in Weimar a year later. He was found guilty and sentenced to 12 years in prison. After the trial, he returned to Katowice. It is not known if he served any time in prison. Grabner was then arrested by the Allies in 1945 and turned over to Poland in 1947. In the Auschwitz Trial he was found guilty of crimes against humanity and sentenced to death. Grabner was hanged on 24 January 1948.

Bibliography
Ernst Klee: Das Personenlexikon zum Dritten Reich: Wer war was vor und nach 1945. Fischer-Taschenbuch-Verlag, Frankfurt am Main 2005;  
 Hermann Langbein: Menschen in Auschwitz. Frankfurt am Main, Berlin Wien, Ullstein-Verlag, 1980; 
 Staatliches Museum Auschwitz-Birkenau (Hrsg.): Auschwitz in den Augen der SS. Oswiecim 1998; 
 Wacław Długoborski, Franciszek Piper (Hrsg.): Auschwitz 1940–1945. Studien zur Geschichte des Konzentrations- und Vernichtungslagers Auschwitz, Verlag Staatliches Museum Auschwitz-Birkenau, Oswiecim 1999, 5 Bände: I. Aufbau und Struktur des Lagers. II. Die Häftlinge - Existentzbedingungen, Arbeit und Tod. III. Vernichtung. IV. Widerstand. V. Epilog; .
 Staatliches Museum Auschwitz-Birkenau (Hrsg): Auschwitz in den Augen der SS. Oswiecim 1998; .
 Laurence Rees: Auschwitz - the Nazis and the 'Final Solution' London: BBC Books,(2005); .

References 

1905 births
1948 deaths
Auschwitz trial executions
German police chiefs
SS-Untersturmführer
Austrian police officers convicted of murder
Austrian people executed abroad
People convicted of murder by Poland
Police officers convicted of crimes against humanity
Auschwitz concentration camp personnel
Gestapo personnel
Military personnel from Vienna
Executed Austrian Nazis
Austrian people convicted of crimes against humanity
Reich Security Main Office personnel
Waffen-SS personnel